Philip Glew (born 28 June 1983 in Grimsby) is a British auto racing driver. He has previously competed in the British Touring Car Championship and British GT Championship. He is currently a commentator for ITV Sport's coverage support races on the TOCA Tour.

Racing career

Junior formulae
After competing in karting, Glew competed in various Formula Ford series between 2001 and 2003. In 2003 he competed in the British Formula Renault Championship, but withdrew after four rounds due to budget constraints. He competed in Formula BMW UK in 2004 and 2005, finishing as runner-up to Tim Bridgman in 2004. He competed in the British GT Championship in 2006, taking a win at Brands Hatch. In 2008 Glew began competing in the British Renault Clio Cup, taking a podium on his series debut and finishing third in the final standings. In 2009 he dominated the series, winning the first four races and ultimately taking 11 wins from 20 races.

British Touring Car Championship
Glew signed up to compete in the 2010 British Touring Car Championship for Triple 8 Race Engineering, however the decision of main sponsor Uniq not to extend their one-round deal left Glew on the sidelines after Thruxton. He returned for the Silverstone meeting in a Special Tuning UK-run SEAT León using a New Generation Touring Car (NGTC) engine.

British GT Championship
Glew returned to the British GT Championship at the Brands Hatch round of the 2011 season with Lotus Sport UK, driving their Lotus Evora GT4 car. He finished the year 5th in the GT4 category with three class victories including one at Spa-Francorchamps. He stayed with the team for 2012 season.

Television
Glew joined ITV Sport in 2014 as a commentator for their coverage of the British Formula Ford Championship and the Renault Clio Cup United Kingdom.

Racing Record

Complete British Touring Car Championship results
(key) (Races in bold indicate pole position – 1 point awarded in first race) (Races in italics indicate fastest lap – 1 point awarded all races) (* signifies that driver lead race for at least one lap – 1 point given)

Complete British GT Championship results
(key) (Races in bold indicate pole position in class) (Races in italics indicate fastest lap in class)

References

External links
Official Website

Living people
English racing drivers
1983 births
Formula Ford drivers
British Formula Renault 2.0 drivers
Formula BMW UK drivers
French Formula Renault 2.0 drivers
British Touring Car Championship drivers
Sportspeople from Grimsby
British GT Championship drivers
Britcar drivers
Renault UK Clio Cup drivers
Tech 1 Racing drivers
Mark Burdett Motorsport drivers
OAK Racing drivers
GT4 European Series drivers